The Galician Socialist Party–Galician Left (PSG-EG, Partido Socialista Galego-Esquerda Galega in Galician language) was a Galician nationalist and left-wing party of Galiza.

History
It was founded in 1984 with the union of the Galician Socialist Party (PSG) and Galician Left, led by Camilo Nogueira Román. In 1993 the PSG-EG formed with nationalist centre-left sectors a new Galician Unity coalition. In the general and autonomic elections of 1993 the party concurred with the United Left (EU) coalition, forming the Galician Unity-United Left (UG-EU) coalition. After the defeat in the elections, some members of the party converged with EU forming the Galician Left-United Left and the others joined the Galician Nationalist Bloc as Galician Unity. The party had 2 mayors: Narón (1985-1993) and Porqueira (1984-1987).

In 1993 it had 1,130 members in 67 local chapters, Vigo being the largest, with 160 members.

Electoral results

Elections

Gallery

References

 Beramendi, X.G. and Núñez Seixas, X.M. (1996): O nacionalismo galego. A Nosa Terra, Vigo
 Beramendi, X.G. (2007): De provincia a nación. Historia do galeguismo político. Xerais, Vigo

Notes

1984 establishments in Spain
1993 disestablishments in Spain
Defunct nationalist parties in Spain
Defunct socialist parties in Galicia (Spain)
Democratic socialist parties in Europe
Galician nationalist parties
Left-wing nationalist parties
Political parties disestablished in 1993